Frank Bernard King (18 September 1912 – 12 May 1981) was an Australian politician.

Biography
He was born in Launceston, of which he was mayor from 1968 to 1969. In 1972 he was elected to the Tasmanian Legislative Council as the independent member for Cornwall. He held the seat until his retirement in 1978.

References

1912 births
1981 deaths
Independent members of the Parliament of Tasmania
Members of the Tasmanian Legislative Council
20th-century Australian politicians